Loyalsock Township High School (Grades 9-12) is a medium sized, suburban high school located in Loyalsock Township, Pennsylvania (near the city of Williamsport). As of the 2016–2017 school year, the school reported an enrollment of 597 pupils in grades 9th through 12th.

The mascot for the school is the Lancer, and the school's colors are Maroon, White and Carolina blue.

Extracurriculars
The Loyalsock Township School District offers a wide variety of clubs, activities and sports programs, including:

National Honor Society
Concert band
Envirothon
Key Club
Leo Club
Marching band
Students Against Destructive Decisions (SADD)
Student Council
Yearbook

Sports
The sports funded by the district are:

Boys:
Baseball - AAA
Basketball- AAA
Cross Country - AA
Football - AAA
Golf - AAA
Soccer - AA
Tennis - AA
Track and Field - AA
 Wrestling - AAGirls:
Basketball - AAA
Cheer - AAAAAA
Cross Country - A
Golf - AAA
Soccer (Fall) - AA
Softball - AAA
Girls' Tennis - AA
Track and Field - AA

According to PIAA directory November 2016

Athletic championships

Rivals
Williamsport Area High School (Girls and Boys Basketball)
Montoursville Area High School (Boys Basketball & Football)
South Williamsport Area High School (Football)

Notable alumni
Pat Daneker, retired Major League Baseball pitcher for the Chicago White Sox.
Lawrence Lessig, Harvard professor and 2016 presidential candidate.
Dylan Rockoff, singer-songwriter
Tom Woodruff Jr., Academy Award winning actor, director, producer and special effects supervisor.
Morgan Myles, featured on The Voice 2022

See also
Loyalsock Township School District
List of high schools in Pennsylvania

Gallery

References

External links
Loyalsock Township High School (official website)
Loyalsock Township School District (official Facebook page)

Public high schools in Pennsylvania
Schools in Lycoming County, Pennsylvania